Tracyina is a genus of Californian plants in the tribe Astereae within the family Asteraceae. The genus is named for Calilfornia botanist Joseph Prince Tracy, 1879–1953.

Species
The only known species is Tracyina rostrata, which is known by the common names Indian headdress and beaked tracyina. It is endemic to California, where it is known only from the grassy slopes of the North Coast Ranges north of the San Francisco Bay Area (Humboldt, Trinity, Mendocino, Lake, Alameda, and Sonoma Counties).

References

External links 
Jepson Manual Treatment
UC CalPhotos gallery
photo of herbarium specimen at Missouri Botanical Garden, isotype of Tracyina rostrata 

Astereae
Endemic flora of California
Natural history of the California Coast Ranges
Monotypic Asteraceae genera